Dušan Petrović Šane (Serbian Cyrillic: Душан Петровић Шане; 28 June 1914 – 21 June 1977) was a Yugoslav communist soldier and politician who served as President of the People's Assembly of the Socialist Republic of Serbia from 1963 to 1967.

A Partisan officer from World War II, Petrović was also a Hero of Socialist Labour and a People's Hero of Yugoslavia.

References

Sources
 Da Graca, John V. Heads of State and Government. MacMillan Press, 1985.

1914 births
1977 deaths
Politicians from Kragujevac
Military personnel from Kragujevac
Yugoslav Partisans members
Serbian people of World War II
Presidents of Serbia within Yugoslavia
Recipients of the Order of the People's Hero
League of Communists of Serbia politicians